Mongolestes ("Mongolian robber") is an extinct genus of mesonychid known from the 'Ulan Gochu' formation of Inner Mongolia, and likely originated in Asia. It was the last surviving representative of Mesonychia and became extinct in the early Oligocene.

Mongolestes is distinct from other mesonychids in several dental features, including very large teeth and the loss of the third molar, and a mandibular symphysis that is steeper.

Notes

References

 
 

Mesonychids
Rupelian extinctions
Eocene mammals of Asia
Oligocene mammals of Asia
Prehistoric placental genera